K. Rani may refer to:
 K. Rani (politician)
 K. Rani (singer)